Schulze STV is a draft single transferable vote (STV) ranked voting system designed to achieve proportional representation. It was invented by Markus Schulze, who developed the Schulze method for resolving ties using a Condorcet method. Schulze STV is similar to CPO-STV in that it compares possible winning candidate pairs and selects the Condorcet winner. It is not used in parliamentary elections. 

The system is based on Schulze's investigations into vote management and free riding. When a voter prefers a popular candidate, there is a strategic advantage to first choosing a candidate who is unlikely to win (Woodall free riding) or omitting his preferred candidate from his rankings (Hylland free riding). According to Schulze, vote management is party coordination of free riding.

Although Schulze STV is intended to be resistant to both types of free riding, Hylland free riding is impossible to eliminate. Schulze introduced a criterion he called "weak invulnerability to Hylland free riding". A method meets this criterion if it is invulnerable to Hylland free riding, except in cases where the Droop proportionality criterion would be violated. Schulze STV meets this criterion.

Scenario
Each voter ranks candidates in their order of preference. In a hypothetical election, three candidates vie for two seats; Andrea and Carter represent the Yellow Party, and Brad represents the Purple Party. Andrea is a popular candidate, and has supporters who are not Yellow Party supporters. It is assumed that the Yellow Party can influence their own supporters, but not Andrea's.

There are 90 voters, and their preferences are

In the STV system, the initial tallies are:
Andrea (Y): 50
Carter (Y): 13
Brad (P): 27

The quota is determined according to 
Andrea is declared elected and her surplus, is distributed with 

Carter (Y): 
Brad (P): 

Brad is also elected.

The Schultze STV system has three possible outcomes (sets of winners) in the election: Andrea and Carter, Andrea and Brad, and Carter and Brad. In this system, any candidate with more than the Droop quota of first choices will be elected. Andrea is certain to be elected, with two possible outcomes: Andrea and Carter, and Andrea and Brad.

Resistance to vote management

In vote management, a party instructs its voters not to rank a popular party candidate first. If the Yellow Party's leaders instruct their supporters to choose Carter first (followed by Andrea), the balloting changes. Unlike STV, however, Schulze STV resists vote management.

Potential for tactical voting

Proportional representation systems are much less susceptible to tactical voting systems than single-winner systems such as the first past the post system and instant-runoff voting (IRV), if the number of seats to be filled is sufficiently large. Schulze STV has additional resistance to forms of tactical voting which are specific to single transferable voting methods.

All forms of STV that reduce to IRV in single winner elections fail the monotonicity criterion. This means that it is sometimes possible to benefit a candidate by ranking them lower than one's true order of preference, or to harm a candidate by ranking them higher. This isn't the case for Schulze STV. When some voters rank candidate  higher without changing the order in which they rank the other candidates relatively to each other, then the strength of the vote management of the candidates  against candidate  can't increase.

As Schulze STV reduces to the Schulze method in single winner elections, it fails the participation criterion, the later-no-harm criterion and the later-no-help criterion, whereas traditional forms of STV (that reduce to IRV in single winner elections) fulfill later-no-help and later-no-harm.

STV methods which make use of Meek's or Warren's method are resistant to Woodall Free Riding, but are still vulnerable to Hylland Free Riding. Schulze's method is not vulnerable to Hylland Free Riding, except where necessary in order to meet the Droop proportionality criterion.

A method which doesn't meet the Droop proportionality criterion has the potential to give disproportional results, unless it meets a similar proportionality criterion. Thus, Schulze STV can be considered invulnerable to Hylland Free Riding to as great an extent possible, subject to actually being a proportional representation method.

Complexity

Schulze STV is no more complicated for the voter than other forms of STV; the ballot is the same, and candidates are ranked in order of preference. In calculating an election result, however, Schulze STV is significantly more complex than STV. In most applications, computer calculation would be required. The algorithm implementing Schulze STV requires exponentially many steps in the number of seats to be filled (roughly on the order of  steps when k out of m candidates are to be selected), making the computation difficult if this number is not very small (in particular, the rule does not have polynomial runtime).

Compared to CPO-STV, implementing Schulze STV might be somewhat faster, since it only compares outcomes differing by one candidate; CPO-STV compares all possible pairs.

References

External links
 The Schulze Method of Voting (section 9) by Markus Schulze
 Python implementation

Single transferable vote